The Ministry of Law, Justice and Parliamentary Affairs is a governmental body of Nepal dealing with the management of the judicial administration, legal affairs and legislative activities.

History
The Department of Law (कानून विभाग) was established in 1950 before being developed into a ministry in 1956. Two years later, the ministry's portfolio was adjusted for the first time, making it the Ministry of Government and Law (कानून तथा संसदीय प्रबन्ध मन्त्रालय). In 1961, it was again renamed to the Ministry of Law and Justice (कानून तथा न्याय मन्त्रालय). The term Parliamentary Affairs was added and dropped several times throughout the history of the ministry.

Ministers of Law, Justice and Parliamentary Affairs (Former and Current)

Ministers of Law, Justice and Parliamentary Affairs 
Some individuals were known as the Minister of Law, Power and Irrigation, Minister of Home and Law, Minister of State for Law and Justice or the Minister of Agriculture, Law and Justice.

Ministers of Law, Justice, Constituent Assembly and Parliamentary Affairs (since 2013)

See also

 Justice ministry
 Politics of Nepal

References

Law, Justice, Constituent Assembly and Parliamentary Affairs
Nepal
Parliamentary affairs ministries